"Come Home" is a song by English alternative rock band Placebo. It appears on the group's 1996 eponymous debut album and was released as the lead single from the album on 5 February 1996.

Content 

Placebo frontman Brian Molko has described "Come Home" was "pop-punk for postponed suicides".

Music video 

The music video for the song features the band performing the song in a small room.

Release 

"Come Home" was released as the lead single from Placebo on 5 February 1996. It reached number 86 in the UK Singles Chart.

Track listing
CD

"Come Home" – 4:40
"Drowning by Numbers" – 2:59
"Oxygen Thief" – 3:36

7" vinyl

"Come Home"
"Drowning by Numbers"

Personnel

Placebo

Brian Molko – vocals, guitar, production
Stefan Olsdal – bass, production
Robert Schultzberg – drums, production

 Additional personnel

 Fulton Dingley – engineering on tracks 1 & 2
 Miki Moore – engineering on track 3
 Adam Maynard – front cover art
 Alex Weston – back cover photography

Charts

References

External links
 

Placebo (band) songs
1996 singles
1996 songs
Songs written by Brian Molko
Songs written by Stefan Olsdal
Songs written by Robert Schultzberg